Sturges is a surname, and may refer to:
 Alberta Sturges (1877–1951), American heiress and, by marriage, 9th Countess of Sandwich
 Graeme Sturges (born 1955), Australian politician
 Herbert Sturges (1882–1958), statistician
 Jock Sturges (born 1947), American photographer
 John Sturges (1911–1982), American film director 
 Jonathan Sturges (1740–1819), American lawyer and jurist
 Jonathan Sturges (businessman) (1802–1874), American businessman and arts patron
 Lewis B. Sturges (1763–1844), American politician
 Matthew Sturges (born 1970), American comics author
 Preston Sturges (1898–1959), American film director and writer 
 Ralph W. Sturges (1918–2007), American Mohegan tribal chief
 Robert Sturges (1891–1970), British Royal Marines officer
 Shannon Sturges (born 1968), American actress
 William Sturges Bourne (1769–1845), British politician

See also
 Sturges, Missouri
 Sturges' formula in Histogram
 Sturgis (surname), alternative spelling
 Sturgess